Gennady Serafimovich Shikin (30 August 1938 – 2006) was a Soviet and Russian diplomat.

From 24 October 1986 to 24 May 1990, Shikin was Ambassador of the Soviet Union to Austria, and from 25 December 1991 to 29 January 1996 he was Ambassador of Russia to Yugoslavia.

References

1938 births
2006 deaths
Ambassadors of the Soviet Union to Austria
Ambassadors of Russia to Yugoslavia
Ambassadors of the Soviet Union to Yugoslavia